Bement is a village in Piatt County, Illinois, United States. Its population was 1,484 at the 2020 census.

Geography

Demographics

As of the census of 2000, there were 1,784 people, 687 households, and 485 families residing in the village. The racial makeup of the village was 98.37% White, 0.90% African American, 0.22% Asian, 0.11% from other races, and 0.39% from two or more races. Hispanic or Latino of any race were 0.34% of the population.

There were 687 households, out of which 31.7% had children under the age of 18 living with them, 58.5% were married couples living together, 8.7% had a female householder with no husband present, and 29.4% were non-families. 25.6% of all households were made up of individuals, and 12.1% had someone living alone who was 65 years of age or older. The average household size was 2.48 and the average family size was 2.97.

In the village, the population was spread out, with 23.7% under the age of 18, 8.2% from 18 to 24, 29.1% from 25 to 44, 21.8% from 45 to 64, and 17.2% who were 65 years of age or older. The median age was 38 years. For every 100 females, there were 96.5 males. For every 100 females age 18 and over, there were 91.8 males.

The median income for a household in the village was $40,163, and the median income for a family was $47,652. Males had a median income of $30,641 versus $21,944 for females. The per capita income for the village was $17,995. About 3.1% of families and 6.2% of the population were below the poverty line, including 5.4% of those under age 18 and 5.7% of those age 65 or over.

Bryant Cottage

Bryant Cottage is located in Bement. Built in 1856 by Francis E. Bryant, it is now preserved as an example of pioneer architecture and as an important historic site. Due to former Governor Blagojevich's budget cuts, Bryant Cottage was scheduled to close, even though it is an important landmark in Abraham Lincoln's political career. But, because of local efforts, Bryant Cottage will remain open to the public.

References

External links
Bement.com

Villages in Piatt County, Illinois
Villages in Illinois